Mario Jozić (born 21 June 1972) is a Croatian retired football goalkeeper. He's played for NK Marsonia, Dinamo Zagreb and Lokomotiva Zagreb.

Club career
Mario Jozic started his career in NK Marsonia from Slavonski Brod. In 2002, he came to NK Dinamo. He eventually ended his career in November 2008.

References

External links
Mario Jozić: Vratare učim na malo posla, ali bez prava na pogrešku 

1972 births
Living people
Sportspeople from Slavonski Brod
Association football goalkeepers
Croatian footballers
NK Marsonia players
NK Slaven Belupo players
GNK Dinamo Zagreb players
NK Lokomotiva Zagreb players
Croatian Football League players
First Football League (Croatia) players